Ronald Rae is a Scottish sculptor born in Ayr, Scotland, in 1946. His works are entirely hand-carved in granite. He has over fifty outdoor granite sculptures in public and private collections throughout the UK. His largest work to date is the 20 tonne Lion of Scotland. Solo exhibitions include Regent's Park, London (1999–2002) and Holyrood Park, Edinburgh. (2006–2007)

Collections

Public works include Widow Woman, purchased for the permanent collection  of the Jerwood Foundation.

In April 2009, Rae's eight-tonne sculpture Fish was installed on the waterfront at Cramond after a successful fundraising campaign by the Cramond Community. The sculpture was carved from a 460 million-year-old granite stone in the grounds of Cramond Kirk over a period of eight months.

In February 2008, the sculpture Fallen Christ was sited outside the MacLeod Centre on the island of Iona and dedicated to the memory of Jim Hughes a member of the Iona Community.

Other granite sculptures in public sites include O Wert Thou in the Cauld Blast at Milton Keynes Railway Station, five sculptures depicting The Tragic Sacrifice of Christ in Rozelle Park, Alloway and Abraham at the Royal Edinburgh Hospital, Return of the Prodigal at Aviva, Perth, Famine and Mark of the Nail at St John's Church, Edinburgh, The Good Samaritan at Riverside Park, Glenrothes, Sheep at Almond Valley Heritage Centre, Livingston, Sacred Cow at Victoria Quays, Sheffield, Insect and Celtic Cross at Erdington Railway Station, Birmingham, Elephant and Rhino at Dormston Art Centre, Dudley, Hiroshima Departed at the Japanese Peace Park, Willen Lake, Milton Keynes, War Veteran and Animals in War Memorial on loan to Bletchley Park, The Cramond Fish at Cramond Waterfront, Edinburgh, Baby Boar at Aberdeen Airport. Heavy Horse and Foal at the Crinan Canal on temporary loan to Scottish Canals. Horse and Highland Cow at Isle of Eriska Hotel, Argyll.

Portrait of Rae

Ronald Rae agreed to sit for sculptor Jon Edgar in 2011 as part of a new series of sculpture-related heads. This was exhibited at Yorkshire Sculpture Park in 2013 as part of the Sculpture Series Heads  exhibition.

References

External links

Illustrated web archive of works by Ronald Rae
Pictures of granite stone sculptures by Ronnie Rae in Rozelle Park, Alloway

1946 births
British sculptors
British male sculptors
Living people